Ferndale was an unincorporated community in  Casey County, Kentucky, United States. It was also known as Poodle Doo.

References

Unincorporated communities in Casey County, Kentucky
Unincorporated communities in Kentucky